Antonello Joseph Sarte Perez (February 17, 1993 – April 17, 2011)  was a Filipino actor. He was a member of ABS-CBN's Star Magic in Batch 13. He portrayed one of the lead characters in the 2009 miniseries Your Song Presents: Underage. In 2010, he played his first main role on primetime in the television series, Sabel. He died at the aged of 18, in a vehicular accident in Moncada, Tarlac, on midnight of April 17, 2011.

Early life
Perez was born on February 17, 1993, to a Bicolana mother, Maria Victoria "Marivic" (née Sarte) and Bacolodnon father, Gerardo "Gerry" Perez. He had a younger brother named Angello Michael "Gello" (born May 16, 1998). He was a nephew of Albay politician Cong. Elfren Sarte. He attended high school at La Salle Greenhills in Greenhills, Mandaluyong, and graduated on March 20, 2011. He planned to take up Marketing at the De La Salle University because he wanted to help run the family business.

Career
Perez was discovered by ABS-CBN in a TV commercial for Milo. He attended self-enhancement workshops with ABS-CBN Talent Center and was one of the new talents launched by Star Magic on its 13th Anniversary in 2006.

The same year, Perez, along with the rest of Star Magic Batch 13, made a cameo appearance in the Komiks special episode Bampy. He then appeared in Star Magic Presents: All About A Girl along with Piolo Pascual and Lauren Young—his first team up with Young—they would then subsequently appear in several TV shows opposite each other. He was later cast as Josh Smith, his first regular TV appearance, in the youth-oriented TV series Star Magic Presents: Abt Ur Luv. In December 2006, he made his film debut in the award-winning Star Cinema film Kasal, Kasali, Kasalo, where he played the younger brother of Judy Ann Santos.

In 2007, Perez's Josh Smith was promoted to a lead character in Star Magic Presents: Abt Ur Luv and subsequently crossed over to Abt Ur Luv Ur Lyf 2, after the show was revamped.  In the latter part of the year, he reprised his role as Otap in Sakal, Sakali, Saklolo—the sequel of Kasal, Kasali, Kasalo.

In December 2007, Perez appeared in Bahay Kubo: A Pinoy Mano Po!, an entry to the 33rd Metro Manila Film Festival. When Abt Ur Luv Lyf 2 ended its two-year run, Perez went to appear in two seasons of Star Magic Presents: Astigs—namely: Astigs in Haay...School Lyf and Astigs in Luvin Lyf. He was later cast as Bayani Mendoza in the supernatural drama Lobo. Perez made a guest appearance in the "Bato" episode of the romantic fantasy TV series Love Spell and in the Imposible episode of the musical anthology Your Song. He also joined ASAP '08 as one of the Dynamite Dance Crew and appeared in the film Magkaibigan and the direct-to-video film Kelly! Kelly! (Ang Hit na Musical).

In 2008, Robi Domingo joined Perez and the remaining members of ASAPs Dynamite Dance Crew, Chris Gutierrez, Dino Imperial, Sam Concepcion, Arron Villaflor and Enchong Dee to form ASAPs Gigger Boys.  The group was later cast in the TV adaptation of the 1981 film Boystown -- Your Song Presents: Boystown. Earlier, Perez appeared in another TV adaptation -- Your Song Presents: Underage—where he played Gary, opposite of Lauren Young.  He then went to appear in two Star Cinema films; BFF: Best Friends Forever and Ang Tanging Pamilya: A Marry Go Round.

Perez appeared in the romantic comedy film Babe, I Love You and, alongside Robi Domingo and Sam Concepcion, in the multi-narrative horror film Cinco in 2010. His last film appearance was in the comedy film Mamarazzi. He appeared as Jeffrey in the "Kakambal ko'y Manika" episode of Wansapanataym. In December 2010, Perez was cast in Sabel, where he played his first leading role in a teleserye with Jessy Mendiola and Joseph Marco.

His last TV appearance was in the "Tsinelas" episode of the drama anthology Maalaala Mo Kaya, which he finished filming before his death. He played Edgar, the older of the two orphaned boys who walked from Manila to Samar to search for their relatives. The episode also starred Bugoy Cariño. It aired posthumously on April 30, 2011 and earned Perez a posthumous nomination in the 2011 Golden Screen TV Awards for an Outstanding Performance by an Actor in a Single Drama/Telemovie Program.

Perez had earlier appeared as a guest judge in Showtime. Before the accident, Perez was in talks to appear in the Philippine remake of Maria la del Barrio and was also set to play a lead role in Way Back Home, the film debut of Kathryn Bernardo and Julia Montes.

Death
On April 17, 2011, Perez had just finished a show in Dagupan and was riding an ABS-CBN service van on his way home with his father Gerardo, and four others. The driver of the van tried to overtake a trailer truck but collided with a Partas provincial passenger bus along MacArthur Highway in Barangay San Julian, Moncada, Tarlac. He was declared dead on arrival at the Rayos-Valentin Hospital in Paniqui, Tarlac at 12:10 a.m. Initial reports said that the cause of his death was "multiple head injuries". The autopsy, however, revealed that his broken ribs pierced his heart and lungs thus causing his death.

Perez's funeral was held at La Salle Green Hills chapel on April 17–18 before he was transferred in The Christ the King Parish along Greenmeadows Avenue in Quezon City on April 19–26, 2011. President Benigno Aquino III paid his respects on the final night of Perez's wake.

Perez was buried at the Manila Memorial Park in Parañaque on April 26, 2011. His favorite blanket, a pair of rubber shoes, and a watch he gave his younger brother were reportedly placed inside the casket.

ABS-CBN filed a case of reckless imprudence on the driver of the van that carried Perez and four others. The driver was an employee of Southbend Express Services, Inc., a service contractor of ABS-CBN.

Perez's family wanted to donate his corneas to blind singer Fatima Soriano after his mother saw her interview with Boy Abunda on The Bottomline with Boy Abunda. However, Soriano's doctor explained this was not possible because Soriano's problem was her retinas, and only corneas can be transplanted.  Perez's corneas were eventually donated to a 28-year-old man and an 8-year old-boy.

In August 2011, the Eye Bank Foundation of the Philippines posthumously honored Perez as the foundation's poster boy. The event was attended by the Perez family and the recipients of the actor's corneas.

Filmography

Television

Film

Awards and nominations

References

External links

1993 births
2011 deaths
Filipino male child actors
Filipino male film actors
Filipino male television actors
Filipino television personalities
Star Magic
Road incident deaths in the Philippines
Male actors from Metro Manila
21st-century Filipino male actors
Burials at the Manila Memorial Park – Sucat